Cecil Augustus Motteram (ca.1853 – 13 June 1943) was an Australian baker, born in England, who founded Motteram biscuits, later part of Arnott-Motteram, later Arnott's biscuits.

History
C. A. Motteram was born in London, third son of solicitor John Philip Motteram (ca.1817 – 23 April 1890), who emigrated to Australia in 1858 on the Tornado and had a practice in Bendigo, or Sandhurst as it was then known.  He was for two years assistant librarian at the Bendigo Mechanics Institute, then in 1873 moved to South Australia, where he was employed by the Aerated Bread Company. By 1881 he was the company's manager; the company's products included Pilot Bread, Cabin Bread, Adelaide biscuits, Abernethy biscuits, Arrowroot biscuits and Bush biscuits to mention a few.

In 1892 Motteram and fellow-employee engineer Edward Williamson (ca.1864 – 27 July 1927) took over its operation and as Motteram & Williamson bought the business in 1894, and soon became the leading biscuit manufacturer in the State.

In 1909 Motteram left to start his own company; Williamson continued as E. Williamson & Co. in Waymouth Street; he sold the business to E. Williamson Ltd, a company in which he had no interest, in 1924  – three years before his death.

In 1919 Motteram opened his new factory in Grote street near West Terrace. The company became Motteram & Sons Ltd. in 1919.

In 1950 William Arnott Pty. Ltd. of Sydney purchased a half share in the company, which in 1952 became known as Arnott Motteram Ltd.

Family
Motteram married Ada Elliot (ca.1859 – 28 November 1942) on 29 March 1881; they had two daughters Ethel and Gertrude, sons Philip and Walter, and a grandson J. P. Motteram, who continued to manage the company. Their home was at 23 Pier Street, Glenelg.

See also
Contemporary bakers in South Australia include:
Murray & Son, biscuit makers of Coromandel Valley
Matthew Madge baker of Moonta Street and (briefly) MHA
William Menz

References 

1853 births
1943 deaths
Australian food industry businesspeople
Australian people of English descent